Body Blows Galactic is a fighting game developed and published by Team17 in 1993 for the Amiga computers. It is a sequel to 1992's Body Blows. Opponents and background graphics from both games were later merged into the compilation release Ultimate Body Blows.

Gameplay 

After winning the global martial arts tournament, Danny and Junior decide to take the universe further and challenge the meanest and toughest in an interplanetary competition to become the ultimate galactic warrior.

The gameplay system is the same as in the original Body Blows game. The game features single- and two-player modes, as well as an eight-player tournament mode.

There are 12 different playable fighters from six worlds, and no bosses.

Development 
A team of six people developed the game for about nine months. A slightly enhanced version was created for the AGA based Amiga 1200 which has several changes like more colorful backdrops and improved sound effects (by Steven and Gary Nicholas) and music.

Reception 
Body Blows Galactic received mostly favorable reviews. Amiga Computing gave it a score of 93%, stating, "Quite honestly, Body Blows Galactic is the best beat'em up ever to be inserted into the drive of an Amiga." In a special comparison in Amiga Action, the game got a score of 84%, winning or drawing in the category "Atmosphere" and "Two Player Game" against Mortal Kombat and Elfmania. A dissenting review in CU Amiga gave it only a 57%, criticizing unbalanced characters, saying that while Warra, Lazer and Dino are ineffective, the very fast Kai-Ti seems invincible. Other reviews gave the game the ratings 86% in ACAR, 90% in Amiga Dream, 91% in Amiga Force, 88% in Amiga Format, 83% in Amiga Joker, 72% in Amiga Power and 87% in The One. Matt Broughton of The One rated the "lovely in every way" Kai-Ti as the most attractive Amiga fighting game character in a 1995 article.

References

External links 
Body Blows Galactic at Lemon Amiga
Body Blows Galactic at Amiga Hall of Light

1993 video games
Amiga games
Amiga 1200 games
Amiga-only games
Science fiction video games
Team17 games
Fighting games
Video game sequels
Video games scored by Allister Brimble
Video games developed in the United Kingdom